Toivo Uustalo (born 23 August 1946 Puka) is an Estonian politician. He was a member of VII Riigikogu.

References

Living people
1946 births
Members of the Riigikogu, 1992–1995
People from Otepää Parish